A baggage handling system is a type of conveyor system installed in airports that transports checked luggage from ticket counters to areas where the bags can be loaded onto airplanes. A baggage handling system also transports checked baggage coming from airplanes to baggage claims or to an area where the bag can be loaded onto another airplane.

History 
The first automated baggage handling system was invented by BNP Associates in 1971, and this technology is in use in almost every major airport worldwide today.

Process 
A bag is entered into the baggage handling system when an airline agent, or self check system, assign the luggage a tag with a unique ten digit barcode. Airlines are also incorporating RFID chips into the tags to track bags in real time and to reduce the number of mishandled bags. The baggage handling system will then scan and sort the bags by airline. Then a series of diverters along the conveyor belt will direct the bags into the baggage handling area.

Although the primary function of a baggage handling system is the transportation of bags, a typical system will serve other functions involved in making sure that a bag gets to the correct location in the airport.

In addition to sortation, a baggage handling system may also perform the following functions:
  Detection of bag jams
  Volume regulation (to ensure that input points are controlled to avoid overloading the system)
  Load balancing (to evenly distribute bag volume between conveyor sub-systems)
  Bag counting
  Bag tracking
  Automatic Tag Reader (ATR) (Reads the tags on the luggage provided by the airlines)

Security 
Post September 11, 2001, the majority of airports around the world began to implement baggage screening directly into baggage handling systems. These systems are referred to as "Checked Baggage Inspection System" by the Transportation Security Administration (TSA) in the US, where bags are fed directly into Explosive Detection System (EDS) machines. A CBIS can sort baggage based on each bag's security status assigned by an EDS machine or by a security screening operator.

References

External links
How Baggage Handling Works (howstuffworks.com)

Aircraft ground handling
Air freight
Luggage